Owen Thomas may refer to:

People
Owen Thomas (journalist), UK radio and television reporter/presenter
Owen Thomas (writer) (born 1972), former editor of Valleywag
Owen Thomas (politician) (1858–1923), MP for Anglesey, 1918–1923
Owen Thomas (darts player) (born 1964), Welsh darts player
Owen Thomas (playwright) (born 1976), Welsh playwright
Owen John Thomas (born 1939), former Plaid Cymru politician
Owen Thomas, University of Pennsylvania football player and subject of a ground-breaking study on chronic traumatic encephalopathy
Owen Thomas, lead singer in American rock band The Elms

Other
Owen Thomas (automobile company), founded in 1908 in Janesville, Wisconsin

See also
 Dudley Owen-Thomas (born 1948), English lawyer and former first-class cricketer

Thomas, Owen